Boima Kamara is a Liberian politician. He served as the country's minister of finance, a position he held from April 2016 to 2018. Prior to this appointment, he served as the deputy governor of the Central Bank of Liberia.

References

Living people
Date of birth missing (living people)
Liberian politicians
Finance Ministers of Liberia
Year of birth missing (living people)